Bruce Wayne Talamon (born July 31, 1949) is an American photographer. He is best known for photographing R&B and soul musicians during the 1970s and 1980s, and for his editorial work as a contract and stills photographer.

Early life
Born in Los Angeles on July 31, 1949, Talamon was the first of two sons born to James and Clelie Talamon. He began high school in 1963 at the all-boys Catholic Verbum Dei High School, and went on to study political science at Whittier College in California. While studying abroad in Berlin, Germany in 1970, he bought his first camera, an Asahi Pentax, and went on to photograph Miles Davis and Dexter Gordon with it in Copenhagen during his time abroad. After graduating in 1971 with a Bachelor of Arts in political science, he forwent attending law school and instead decided to pursue a career as a photographer.

Career

R&B photography 
After graduating from Whittier College, Talamon received an offer to work as a photographer at the 1972 Watts Festival in Los Angeles. Although he did not end up getting the job, he was able to secure a backstage pass, which allowed him the access needed to take pictures of some of the most notable R&B artists of that era. His photograph of Isaac Hayes was, according Talamon, "the first R&B photograph [he] ever took". It was also on that occasion that he met photographer Howard Bingham and, thanks to Bingham's introducing him to Soul Newspaper'''s owner Regina Jones, began working as a contributing photographer, and later, photo editor.

In 1974, Talamon expanded his client base to include Motown Records, his first corporate client. He was soon shooting publicity and editorial photographs for other record companies, including CBS Records. This same year, he also began working as a freelancer for Jet, Ebony, and Black Stars magazines. Over the span of his career, he shot such household names as Donna Summers, James Brown, Marvin Gaye, Bootsy Collins, and Chaka Khan.

In the late 1970s and early 1980s, Talamon accompanied several artists on tour, including Bob Marley (1978–1980) and Earth, Wind and Fire (1979–1980). His career as a photographer for R&B record companies came effectively to an end in 1982 due to new policies concerning photo buyouts.

 Stills and editorial photography 
Talamon started doing production stills photography in 1975. As a contract photographer for ABC Television, he worked on such shows as Laverne & Shirley, Taxi, American Bandstand, and Charlie's Angels and, in 1980, Don Cornelius hired him to be Soul Train’s stills photographer.

Talamon's first feature film working as a stills photographer was the 1982 Columbia Pictures feature Blue Thunder. He worked on projects at a number of major films studios over the next thirty years, including Staying Alive (1983), The Golden Child (1986), Beverly Hills Cop II (1987), Devil in a Blue Dress (1995), Space Jam (1996) and Larry Crowne (2011).

Talamon also worked as an editorial photographer for Time magazine. His first major assignment for the magazine was covering the 1984 American presidential primaries and the Reverend Jesse Jackson’s run for presidential candidacy. He would cover politics for Time once more during the 1988 Democratic primaries.

Since the mid-1990s, Talamon has been involved in the publication of several photography books and exhibitions featuring his work. These include his book Bob Marley: Spirit Dancer (1994), his contributions to Barack Obama: The Official Inaugural Book (2009), and the exhibition R&B Photographs: 1972–1982 (2014).

 Personal life 
Talamon has a son.

 Publications 
 A Day in the Life of America Photographed by 200 of the World's Leading Photojournalists on One Day. New York: Collins, 1986.
 Talamon, Bruce W., and Roger Steffens. Bob Marley: Spirit Dancer. New York: Norton, 1995.
 Taylor, Clyde, and Barbara Head Millstein. Committed to the Image: Contemporary Black Photographers. New York: Merrell Publishers, 2001.
 Kennerly, David Hume, Pete Souza, and Robert McNeely. The Official Barack Obama Inaugural Book. Minneapolis: Five Ties Publishing, 2009.
 Tilton, Connie Rogers, Steve Cannon, Bruce W. Talamon, and David Hammons. L. A. Object & David Hammons Body Prints. New York: Tilton Gallery, 2011.
 Talamon, Bruce W., Pearl Cleage, and Reuel Golden. Soul, R&B, Funk, Photographs 1972–1982. Cologne: Taschen, 2018.

 Films (as stills photographer) 

 Exhibitions Committed to the Image: Contemporary Black Photographers, Brooklyn Museum, New York, 2001.R&B Photographs: 1972–1982, Contact Photo Lab, The Brewery, Los Angeles, 2014.Hotter Than July'', Rock and Roll Hall of Fame, Cleveland, 2022.

References 

1949 births
Living people
Whittier College alumni
20th-century American photographers
21st-century American photographers
African-American photographers
Movie stills photographers
Soul Train
20th-century African-American artists
21st-century African-American artists